The interrobang, also known as the interabang  (often represented by any of ?!, !?, ?!? or !?!), is an unconventional punctuation mark used in various written languages and intended to combine the functions of the question mark, or interrogative point, and the exclamation mark, or exclamation point, known in the jargon of printers and programmers as a "bang". The glyph is a ligature of these two marks and was first proposed in 1962 by Martin K. Speckter.

Application
A sentence ending with an interrobang asks a question in an excited manner, expresses excitement, disbelief or confusion in the form of a question, or asks a rhetorical question.

For example: 
 You call that a knife‽
 Are you out of your mind‽
 What are those‽

Writers using informal language may use several alternating question marks and exclamation marks for even more emphasis; however, this is regarded as poor style in formal writing.

History

Historically, writers have used multiple punctuation marks to end a sentence expressing surprise and question.

Invention
American Martin K. Speckter (1915 – February 14, 1988) conceptualized the interrobang in 1962. As the head of an advertising agency, Speckter believed that advertisements would look better if copywriters conveyed surprised rhetorical questions using a single mark. He proposed the concept of a single punctuation mark in an article in the magazine TYPEtalks. Speckter solicited possible names for the new character from readers. Contenders included exclamaquest, QuizDing, rhet, and exclarotive, but he settled on interrobang. He chose the name to reference the punctuation marks that inspired it: interrogatio is Latin for "rhetorical question" or "cross-examination"; bang is printers' slang for the exclamation mark. Graphic treatments for the new mark were also submitted in response to the article.

Early interest
In 1965, Richard Isbell created the Americana typeface for American Type Founders and included the interrobang as one of the characters. In 1968, an interrobang key was available on some Remington typewriters. In the 1970s, replacement interrobang keycaps and typefaces were available for some Smith-Corona typewriters.
The interrobang was in vogue for much of the 1960s; the word interrobang appeared in some dictionaries, and the mark was used in magazine and newspaper articles.

Continued support
Most fonts do not include the interrobang, but it has not disappeared. Lucida Grande, the default font for many UI elements of legacy versions of Apple's OS X operating system, includes the interrobang, and Microsoft provides several versions of the interrobang in the Wingdings 2 character set (on the right bracket and tilde keys on US keyboard layouts), included with Microsoft Office. It was accepted into Unicode and is included in several fonts, including Lucida Sans Unicode, Arial Unicode MS, and Calibri, the default font in the Office 2007, 2010, and 2013 suites.

Inverted interrobang
A reverse and upside-down interrobang (combining ¿ and ¡, Unicode character: ⸘), suitable for starting phrases in Spanish, Galician and Asturian—which use inverted question and exclamation marks—is called an "inverted interrobang" or a gnaborretni (interrobang spelled backwards), but the latter is rarely used. In current practice, interrobang-like emphatic ambiguity in Hispanic languages is usually achieved by including both sets of punctuation marks one inside the other (¿¡De verdad!? or ¡¿De verdad?! [Really!?]). Older usage, still official but not widespread, recommended mixing the punctuation marks: ¡Verdad? or ¿Verdad!

Entering and display

Few modern typefaces or fonts include a glyph for the interrobang character. The standard interrobang is at Unicode code point . The inverted interrobang is at Unicode code point .

On macOS, it is found on the Character Palette, obtained by pressing the key combination .

The interrobang can be displayed in LaTeX by using the package textcomp and the command . The inverted interrobang is the command .

Examples of use
The State Library of New South Wales, in Australia, uses an interrobang as its logo, as does the educational publishing company Pearson, which thus intends to convey "the excitement and fun of learning".

Chief Judge Frank H. Easterbrook used an interrobang in the 2012 United States Seventh Circuit opinion Robert F. Booth Trust v. Crowley.

Australian Federal Court Justice Michael Wigney used an interrobang in the first paragraph of his 2018 judgment in Faruqi v Latham [2018] FCA 1328 (defamation proceedings between former Federal Opposition Leader, Mark Latham, and political campaigner and writer, Osman Faruqi).

In chess, an interrobang is used to represent a dubious move, one which is questionable but possibly has merits. (See also the evaluation symbols ?! (dubious move) and !? (interesting move).)

See also
 Irony mark (⸮)
 Inverted question and exclamation marks (¿¡)
 Interrabang an Italian film
 Interbang an Italian television series

References

External links

 The Interrobang: A twentieth-century punctuation mark
 National Punctuation Day Reignites: Interrobang Passion 
 99 Percent Invisible podcast episode and article about the interrobang

Typographical symbols
Punctuation
Symbols introduced in 1962